The Book of Distance is a Canadian virtual reality documentary film, directed by Randall Okita and released in 2020. Made for the National Film Board of Canada, the film is an animated immersive environment placing the viewer inside the context of Okita's grandfather Yonezo Okita's experiences during the internment of Japanese Canadians in World War II.

The film premiered at the 2020 Sundance Film Festival. Its subsequent screenings included the 2020 Vancouver International Film Festival, where it won the award for Best Animation in the Immersed program, and the 2020 Festival du nouveau cinéma, where it won the Horizons award.

It was released commercially to the Steam, Oculus and Viveport platforms.

The film won the Canadian Screen Award for Best Immersive Experience at the 9th Canadian Screen Awards in 2021.

References

External links

2020 short documentary films
Virtual reality films
Canadian animated documentary films
Canadian animated short films
Canadian short documentary films
National Film Board of Canada animated short films
National Film Board of Canada documentaries
Films directed by Randall Okita
Internment of Japanese Canadians
Canadian Screen Award-winning films
2020s English-language films
2020s Canadian films